Cassius Aurelius Boone (February 2, 1850 – December 11, 1917) was an American politician, who was the seventh Mayor of Orlando, Florida, from 1881 to 1882. He was also involved in the hardware and furniture business. He married Sarah Hughey on May 10, 1873. He died when he was 67 and he was interred at Greenwood Cemetery in Orlando.

References

Mayors of Orlando, Florida
1850 births
1917 deaths
19th-century American politicians